Richard Southwell alias Darcy (by 1531 – June 1600) was an English politician.

He was a Member (MP) of the Parliament of England for Gatton in March 1553.

References

1600 deaths
English MPs 1553 (Edward VI)
Year of birth uncertain